Benson Tower can refer to several buildings:

 Benson Tower (New Orleans)
 Benson Tower (Portland, Oregon)

See also
Benson Water Tower, Clayton Street, Benson, Illinois
Benson (disambiguation)